"Rest In Pieces" is a song by American rock band Saliva from the album Back into Your System. Rest in Pieces was written by James Michael and Nikki Sixx, both of Sixx: A.M.

The music video for "Rest In Pieces" shows the band as they are touring.

Track listing

Charts

References

Saliva (band) songs
2003 singles
Rock ballads
Song recordings produced by Bob Marlette
Songs written by Nikki Sixx
Songs written by James Michael